Jussi Award for Best Director is an award presented annually at the Jussi Awards by Filmiaura, a Finnish film organization founded in 1962. The Jussi Awards were created by Elokuvajournalistit ry in 1944 and the first ceremony was held the same year, honoring Finnish films released between 1942 and 1944.

Winners

Multiple winners

References

External links
 

Director